Dark Chords on a Big Guitar is the twenty-fourth studio album (and twenty-sixth overall) by Joan Baez, released in September 2003. The album is more rock-oriented than her prior releases, and it is mostly composed of work by Generation X songwriters, including Natalie Merchant, Ryan Adams and Steve Earle. The title was taken from a line in Greg Brown's song "Rexroth's Daughter". Critics and listeners were surprised that Baez's voice had lost little of its original power and beauty, given that she was sixty-two when she made the album.

The album, produced by Mark Spector, was recorded at Allaire Studios, Shokan, New York, from January to April 2003. Backing musicians included George Javori and Duke McVinnie.

Baez dedicated the album to Michael Moore.

Track listing
 "Sleeper" (Greg Brown) – 4:35
 "In My Time of Need" (Ryan Adams) – 4:33
 "Rosemary Moore" (Caitlin Cary) – 5:15
 "Caleb Meyer" (Gillian Welch, David Rawlings) – 2:31 
 "Motherland" (Natalie Merchant) – 4:44
 "Wings" (Josh Ritter) – 4:01
 "Rexroth's Daughter" (Greg Brown) – 5:19
 "Elvis Presley Blues" (Gillian Welch, David Rawlings) – 4:40
 "King's Highway" (Joe Henry) – 3:28
 "Christmas in Washington" (Steve Earle) – 5:13

Personnel 

Rani Arbo – Background Vocals 
Greg Calbi – Mastering
Steve Chadie – Assistant Engineer
Matthew Cullen – Assistant Engineer
Gail Ann Dorsey – Background Vocals 
James Harley – Assistant Engineer
Byron Isaacs – Electric & Acoustic Bass
George Javori – Drums
Brandon Mason – Engineer, Mixing
Duke McVinnie – Guitar, Bass 
Norman Moore – Art Direction, Design, Photography
Doug Pettibone – Acoustic Guitar
Bo Ramsey – Producer
Mark Spector – Producer
Greg Tobler – Assistant Engineer
Tom Tucker – Engineer
Dana Tynan – Photography

Charts

References

2003 albums
Joan Baez albums